Philip R. Bunker is a British-Canadian scientist and author, known for his work 
in theoretical chemistry and molecular spectroscopy.

Education and early work

Philip Bunker was educated at Battersea Grammar School in Streatham. He received a bachelor's degree at King's College in 1962 and earned a Ph.D. in theoretical chemistry from Cambridge University in 1965, advised by H.C. Longuet-Higgins. The subject of his Ph.D. thesis was 
the spectrum of the dimethylacetylene molecule and its torsional barrier. During Bunker's Ph.D. work in 1963, Longuet-Higgins
published the paper that introduced molecular symmetry groups consisting of feasible
nuclear permutations and permutation-inversions.
Under the guidance of Longuet-Higgins, Bunker applied these new symmetry ideas and introduced the notations G36 and G100 for the molecular symmetry groups of 
dimethylacetylene and ferrocene, respectively. After 
obtaining his Ph.D. degree, he was a postdoctoral fellow with Jon T. Hougen in the 
spectroscopy group of Gerhard Herzberg at the National Research Council of Canada. 
He then spent his entire career at the National Research Council of Canada, eventually 
rising to the position of Principal Research Officer in 1997.

Career and important contributions
Philip Bunker's published scientific work has focused on the use of fundamental quantum mechanics to predict and interpret the spectral properties of polyatomic molecules due to their combined rotational, vibrational, electronic and nuclear-spin states, and their symmetries. He has been particularly concerned with the study of the energy levels and spectra of molecules that undergo large amplitude vibrational motions. Applications of this work to the methylene (CH2) molecule proved to be
important in determining the separation between the singlet and triplet electronic states, and in determining which singlet and triplet rotational levels interact. In the 1990's, he returned to the problem of determining the torsional barrier in 
dimethylacetylene after Robert McKellar and John Johns, experimentalists at the National 
Research Council of Canada, had obtained a very high resolution infrared spectrum of the molecule.

Bunker is a well-known expert in the use of the molecular symmetry group. At the end of Longuet-Higgins' paper in which he
introduced permutation and permutation-inversion molecular symmetry 
groups, Longuet-Higgins wrote: "In conclusion it should be added 
that the present definition can be extended to linear molecules, and to molecules 
where spin-orbit coupling is strong; but these topics are best dealt with separately." However, Longuet-Higgins left the field of theoretical chemistry in 1967; he wrote nothing more about molecular symmetry and did not make these extensions.  Extensions of these principles were subsequently made to linear molecules as well as to molecules with strong spin-orbit coupling Bunker is also known for his work in the quantitative description of non-adiabatic effects in quantum molecular dynamics.

Together with Per Jensen (1956-2022), who was a theoretical chemist at Bergische Universität Wuppertal, Bunker has written two books on theoretical chemistry and molecular spectroscopy; Molecular Symmetry and Spectroscopy (1998) and Fundamentals of Molecular Symmetry (2005).
Currently, Bunker is Researcher Emeritus at the National Research Council of Canada and a guest scientist at the Fritz-Haber Institute of the Max Planck Society. He has also held visiting scientist positions at universities and institutions around the world during the course of his career, including ETH-Zurich, Massey University, Kyushu University and University of Florence.

Awards and honors
Bunker received the Humboldt Prize (1995), the Medaili Jana Marca Marci of the Czech Spectroscopy Society (2002), and the 2002 Sir Harold Thompson Memorial Award, which is sponsored by Pergamon Press (now Elsevier) for the most significant advance in spectroscopy published in Spectrochimica Acta each year. He is a fellow of the International Union of Pure and Applied Chemistry.

Personal life
Bunker married Eva Cservenits in 1966. Their son, Alex E. Bunker, is a computational chemist at the University of Helsinki who has co-authored more than 50 research articles. Philip Bunker's cousin, Ernest Edmonds, is a British 
artist, a pioneer in the field of computer art 
and its variants, algorithmic art, generative art, 
and interactive art.

References

External links
Medaili Jana Marca Marci. https://lcms.cz/companies/7
Prof. Bunker's personal web site at https://chemphys.ca/pbunker/
 
Excerpt from Battersea Grammar School Magazine, 1959, courtesy of the Old Grammarians website.

Living people
Canadian chemists
Spectroscopists
National Research Council (Canada)
Alumni of King's College London
1941 births